Eupleres is a genus of two species of mongoose-like euplerid mammal native to Madagascar that are known as falanoucs. They are primarily terrestrial and consume mainly invertebrates.

Species 
Eastern falanouc, Eupleres goudotii -  mesic forests of eastern Madagascar
Western falanouc, Eupleres major - xeric areas in northwestern Madagascar

Conservation status 
The IUCN Red List lists E. goudotii as vulnerable, while E. major has been assessed as endangered.

References 

Carnivorans of Africa
Euplerids
Endemic fauna of Madagascar
Taxa named by Louis Michel François Doyère